Lars Gustav Fredrik Mellström (September 14, 1904 – May 4, 1983) was a Swedish boxer for Hammarby IF who competed in the 1928 Summer Olympics.

In 1928 he was eliminated in the second round of the bantamweight class after losing his fight to János Széles.

External links
profile

1904 births
1983 deaths
Bantamweight boxers
Olympic boxers of Sweden
Boxers at the 1928 Summer Olympics
Swedish male boxers
20th-century Swedish people